The Katsukawa school (勝川派, -ha) was a school of Japanese ukiyo-e art, founded by Miyagawa Shunsui. It specialized in paintings (nikuhitsu-ga) and prints of kabuki actors (yakusha-e), sumo wrestlers, and beautiful women (bijin-ga).

The painter Miyagawa Shunsui changed his surname to Katsukawa.  One of his students, Katsukawa Shunshō, took his surname and abandoned the school's tradition of painting well-dressed beauties in favour of yakusha-e portraits of kabuki actors, a domain once dominated by the Torii school.  This new focus revived the actor print, which had lost popularity after Suzuki Harunobu's portraits of beauties rose to prominence in the late 1760s.

Shunshō introduced the ōkubi-e "large-headed picture" in the 1760s.  He and other members of the Katsukawa school, such as Shunkō, popularized ōkubi yakusha-e prints and the dusting of mica in the backgrounds to produce a luxurious glittering effect.

Shunsui was the son and student of Miyagawa Chōshun, and he in turn taught Katsukawa Shunshō, who is regarded as one of the leading artists of the school. Shunshō personally focused on ōkubi-e headshot actor portraits in his prints, and bijin in his paintings.

Other artists of the school included Shunchō, Shun'ei, and Hokusai (as Katsukawa Shunrō).

The Katsukawa school was created as the result of political oppression of the Kanō school of painting by the Tokugawa shogunate around 1750. Many of the students of Chōshun and Shunsui were arrested and banished, and Chōshun died soon afterwards in 1752. Though the shogunate seemed benevolently inclined towards the Miyagawa school, Shunsui changed the name to Katsu-Miyagawa and then simply to Katsukawa.

The school was particularly popular in the last decades of the 18th century, and was renowned for its realistic actor portraits. Unlike those of the Torii school, which were more stylized, Katsukawa portraits sought to express the individual identities and personalities of those depicted. Around 1800, however, the Utagawa school rose to prominence, replacing the Katsukawa in producing the most popular actor portraits. The school thus came to an end around 1840.

Members of the school

The members of the school are alphetically listed.  The names of the students are indented below their masters.

 Katsukawa Shunshō (1726–1792)
 Katsukawa Shunbō (active 1780–1800)
 Katsukawa Shunchō (also written ; active 1780–1795)
 Katsukawa Shunchō (active 1790–1800)
  (also written ; active 1770–1790)
 Katsukawa Shun'ei (1762–1819) 
  (active c. 1795 – c. 1805)
  (active 1805–1830)
  (active 1787–1795)
 Katsukawa Shungyoku (active 1800–1830)
  (d. 1787, active 1777–1785)
 Katsukawa Shōju ( (??); active 1790–1800)
 Katsukawa Shunkei (active 1820–1830)
 Katsukawa Shunkō (active 1805–1830)
  (active 1800–1830)
  (active 1784–1800)
  (active 1820–1830)
 Katsukawa Shunsai (active 1830–1840)
 Katsukawa Shunsei (active vers 1810)
 Katsukawa Shunsei (active 1820–1830)
 Katsukawa Shunsen (active ), later called Katsukawa Shunkō II
 Katsukawa Shunsetsu (active 1805–1815)
  (active 1820–1830)
  (1770–1820)
  (d. 1856)
 } (1837–1902)
  (active )
 Katsugawa Shun'yō (active 1820–1830)
 Katsugawa Shunyū (active 1805–1830)
 Katsugawa Shungyō (active 1780–1840)
 Katsukawa Shunkaku (active 1790–1800)
 Katsukawa Shunkō (active 1770–1790)
 Katsukawa Shunkō (active 1790–1820)
 Katsukawa Shunkō I (signed also Shunō ; 1743–1812)
 Katsukawa Shunkyoku (active 1775–1800)
 Katsukawa Shunri (active 1780–1800)
 Katsukawa Shunryū (active 1790–1800)
 Katsukawa Shunryū (active 1790–1800)
 Katsukawa Shunrin (active 1781–1801)
 Katsukawa Shunrō I (1760–1849), later called Katsushika Hokusai
 Katsukawa Shunrō II (d. 1817, active 1785–1797), later called Utagawa Toyomaru
 Katsukawa Shunsen (active )
 Katsukawa Shunsen (active 1780–1800)
 Katsukawa Shunsui (active 1770s), later called Tamagawa Shunsui
 Katsukawa Shunwa (active 1790–1830)
 Katsukawa Shunzan I (active 1778–1800)
 Katsukawa Shunzan II (d. 1871)

The follow artists are also associated with the Katsukawa school, though they do not bear the surname:

 Kinshōdō Sekiga (active 1770s–1780s)
  (1744–1789)
 Koikawa Harumachi II (active ), later called 
  (active 1800–1820), later called Banki Harumasa

References

Works cited

Japanese Architecture and Art Net Users System (JAANUS). (2001). Accessed 29 August 2006.

External links
Bridge of dreams: the Mary Griggs Burke collection of Japanese art, a catalog from The Metropolitan Museum of Art Libraries (fully available online as PDF), which contains material on this artist (see index)